Wirral Metropolitan Borough Council, or simply Wirral Council, is the local authority of the Metropolitan Borough of Wirral in Merseyside, England. It is a metropolitan district council, one of five in Merseyside and one of 36 in the metropolitan counties of England, and provides the majority of local government services in Wirral. It is a constituent council of Liverpool City Region Combined Authority.

History
The current local authority was first elected in 1973, a year before formally coming into its powers and prior to the creation of the Metropolitan Borough of Wirral on 1 April 1974. The council gained borough status, entitling it to be known as Wirral Metropolitan Borough Council.

Timeline
1973 First election.
1974 Metropolitan borough of Wirral established.
1975 Conservatives take control of council.
1986 Council falls under No Overall Control.
1991 Labour take control of the council for the first time.
1992 Council falls under No Overall Control.
1995 Labour take control of the council.
2002 Council falls under No Overall Control.
200506 Hilary Jones (Hoylake and Meols) becomes UKIP's first (and last) representation on the council. Elected as a Conservative (later resigning the whip in 2004).
2008 Last Liberal Democrat gain until 2019.
2011 Liberal Democrat leader, and then Deputy Leader of the council, Simon Holbrook loses his Prenton seat to Labour's Paul Doughty after 12 years as a councillor.
2012 Labour take control of the council.
2013 Last Conservative Gain in Leasowe and Moreton East by-election (lost in the following years election).
2014 Greens make first gain in Wirral with Pat Cleary ousting Labour's, then cabinet member for the environment, Brian Kenny in their traditionally safe seat of Birkenhead and Tranmere.
2015 Last Labour gain.
2019 Council falls under No Overall Control, first net gain for the Liberal Democrats since 2008.

Council leadership

Leader of the Council and Cabinet

Leader of the Opposition and Shadow Cabinet

Mayor of Wirral

The Mayor of Wirral (or Civic Mayor of Wirral) is a ceremonial post elected annually, along with a deputy, by Wirral Metropolitan Borough Council. The role of the mayor includes chairing council meetings, representing the Borough at civic functions, supporting local charities and conferring Honorary Freemen and Aldermen.

The incumbent mayor and deputy mayor are Cllr George Davies and Cllr Jeff Green.

Wards and councillors
Each ward is represented by three councillors.

Political makeup
Only four parties have won seats to Council: Conservative, Green, Labour and Liberal Democrat (and its predecessors). All other political representation has come via changes in affiliation.

Leaders

Leaders and control
Since the first election to the council in 1973 political control of the council has been held by the following parties:

Party leaders

Notes

References

External links
Wirral Council
Wirral Conservatives
Wirral Green Party
Wirral Labour
Wirral Lib Dems

Metropolitan district councils of England
Local authorities in Merseyside
Leader and cabinet executives
Local education authorities in England
Billing authorities in England
1974 establishments in England
Council